"My Country" is a poem about Australia, written by  Dorothea Mackellar (1885–1968) at the age of 19 while homesick in the United Kingdom.  After travelling through Europe extensively with her father during her teenage years, she started writing the poem in London in 1904 and re-wrote it several times before her return to Sydney.  The poem was first published in The Spectator in London on 5 September 1908 under the title "Core of My Heart".  It was reprinted in many Australian newspapers, such as The Sydney Mail and New South Wales Advertiser, who described the 'little poem' as striking the right note of "...the clear, ringing, triumphant note of love and trust in [Australia]." The poem quickly became well known and established Mackellar as a poet.

Mackellar's family owned substantial properties in the Gunnedah district of New South Wales and a property (Torryburn) in the Paterson district of the Hunter Region. The poem is believed to have been directly inspired by witnessing the breaking of a drought when she was at Torryburn;  "My Country" uses imagery to describe the land after the breaking of a long drought.  Of ragged mountain ranges possibly refers to the Mount Royal Ranges, and the Barrington Tops.

To many Australians the poem is an overtly romanticised version of "The Australian condition", as Mackellar's family were of considerable fortune and social favour.  The poem reflects the romanticised and somewhat idealised reflection of a writer yearning to be taken back to Gunnedah.

The first stanza, lesser-known, refers to England, and the fact that the vast majority of Australians of that era were of British birth or ancestry.  The second stanza describes Australia and is amongst the best-known pieces of Australian poetry.

In an interview in 1967, Mackellar described her reasons for writing the poem.

MacKellar's first anthology of poems, The Closed Door, published in Australia in 1911, included the poem.  The last line of the third stanza, "And ferns the warm dark soil" was originally "And ferns the crimson soil".  Her second  anthology, The Witch Maid & Other Verses, published in 1914, included the original version.

A recording of "My Country" made by the radio and TV actor Leonard Teale became so popular in the 1970s that his reading of the first lines of the second stanza were often used to parody him.

Notes

References

http://www.dorotheamackellar.com.au
http://www.sl.nsw.gov.au/discover_collections/people_places/caergwrle/mycountry/index.html

External links
 'My Country' was added to the National Film and Sound Archive's Sounds of Australia registry in 2009
 Listen to 'My Country' read by Dorothea Mackellar and read more about it on australianscreen online

Australian poems
1908 poems